Crestwood is a city in south St. Louis County, Missouri, United States, part of the Metropolitan Statistical Area known as Greater St. Louis. The population was 11,912 at the 2010 census.

In 2011, Bloomberg Businessweek magazine named Crestwood the "Best Place to Raise Kids in Missouri," lauding the community for top-tier schools and excellent municipal services.

Geography

Crestwood is located at  (38.557552, -90.376152).

Crestwood is home to several public parks, including Crestwood Park, featuring baseball and soccer fields, a playground, and tennis courts, and Whitecliff Park, featuring the Crestwood Community Center and the Crestwood Aquatic Center, a public water park. Adjacent to Whitecliff Park in the small city of Grantwood Village is the animal reserve owned by Anheuser-Busch called Grant's Farm, which is free and open to the public during the summer. Grant's Farm, now home to free-roaming buffalo, zebras, and deer among other animals, is located on property formerly owned by president Ulysses S. Grant in the period between the Mexican War and the Civil War.

Crestwood is the burial place of Sgt. John Sappington. He was a Revolutionary War soldier who was a personal bodyguard to Gen. George Washington at Valley Forge. He was also one of the pioneers at Fort Boonesborough in Madison County, Kentucky. The Sappingtons were large land owners in the area, and Mark and Thomas Sappington's homes still stand in the vicinity. The Sappington Cemetery is maintained by the City of Crestwood, and several Sappington descendants still pass through to maintain the family graves. Crestwood is also the final resting place of Revered Moses Dickson buried in Father Dickson Cemetery and is one of the historic stops along Grant's Trail a biking and walking trail in St. Louis County, Missouri

Demographics

2010 census

As of the census of 2010, there were 11,912 people, 5,153 households, and 3,348 families living in the city. The racial makeup of the city was 93.8% White, 1.6% African American, 0.2% Native American, 2.4% Asian, 0.1% Pacific Islander, 0.4% from other races, and 1.7% from two or more races. Hispanic or Latino of any race were 1.9% of the population.

There were 5,153 households, of which 25.4% had children under the age of 18 living with them, 52.6% were married couples living together, 9.3% had a female householder with no husband present, 3.1% had a male householder with no wife present, and 35.0% were non-families. 30.6% of all households were made up of individuals, and 16.5% had someone living alone who was 65 years of age or older. The average household size was 2.29 and the average family size was 2.87.

The median age in the city was 46 years. 20.5% of residents were under the age of 18; 6.1% were between the ages of 18 and 24; 22% were from 25 to 44; 29.2% were from 45 to 64; and 22.3% were 65 years of age or older. The gender makeup of the city was 47.1% male and 52.9% female.

2000 census
As of the census of 2000, there were 11,863 people, 5,111 households, and 3,521 families living in the city. The racial makeup of the city was 96.41% White, 0.72% African American, 0.19% Native American, 1.45% Asian, 0.01% Pacific Islander, 0.26% from other races, and 0.96% from two or more races. Hispanic or Latino of any race were 1.00% of the population.

There were 5,111 households, out of which 24.0% had children under the age of 18 living with them, 57.8% were married couples living together, 8.7% had a female householder with no husband present, and 31.1% were non-families. 27.5% of all households were made up of individuals, and 14.9% had someone living alone who was 65 years of age or older. The average household size was 2.32 and the average family size was 2.83.

In the city, the population was spread out, with 20.0% under the age of 18, 5.9% from 18 to 24, 24.3% from 25 to 44, 25.0% from 45 to 64, and 24.8% who were 65 years of age or older. The median age was 45 years. For every 100 females, there were 88.8 males. For every 100 females age 18 and over, there were 85.3 males.

The median income for a household in the city was $54,185, and the median income for a family was $64,240. Males had a median income of $46,473 versus $31,934 for females. The per capita income for the city was $26,793. About 1.5% of families and 2.4% of the population were below the poverty line, including 3.8% of those under age 18 and 1.6% of those age 65 or over.

Governance
The city is governed by a mayor and a board of aldermen.  The board comprises eight aldermen, two from each of the cities four wards.  The mayor and aldermen are elected for three year terms.  The current mayor is Grant Mabie. Mayor Gregg Roby resigned on June 5, 2018 for health concerns. Mayor Roby was in his second term of office which runs until April 2020.

The current aldermen are:
 Ward 1; Richard Breeding (re-elected April 2019) and Jesse Morrison (elected April 2021)
 Ward 2; Mary Stadter (re-elected April 2019) and Justin Charbonneau (re-elected  April 2021)
 Ward 3; Greg Hall (appointed 2018, elected in 2019) and Scott Shipley (re-elected  April 2021)
 Ward 4; Tony Kennedy (re-elected April 2019) and John Sebben (elected April 2021)

Education
Lindbergh Schools serves almost all of Crestwood, while Affton School District serves a small portion. Their respective high schools are Lindbergh High School, and Affton High School.

Public schools of the Lindbergh District within the Crestwood City limits:
 Crestwood Elementary School
 Long Elementary School
 Truman Middle School (partially in Crestwood, partially in Sunset Hills)

A private school, Holy Cross Academy is in Crestwood.

Nearby schools:

Senior high schools:
 Cor Jesu Academy (Affton)
 Lutheran High School South (Affton)
 St. John Vianney High School (Kirkwood)
 Ursuline Academy (Oakland)
Grade schools:

 Christ Community Lutheran School (Webster Groves)
 Queen of Holy Rosary School (Webster Groves)
 St. Justin The Martyr School (Sunset Hills)

Police department
The town has a police department with a total of 27 employees.

References

External links
 City of Crestwood official website
 

Cities in St. Louis County, Missouri
Cities in Missouri